The Men's Points Race is one of the 10 men's events at the 2010 UCI Track Cycling World Championships, held in Ballerup, Denmark.

21 Cyclists participated in the contest. The Final was held on 24 March.

Results

References

Results

Men's points race
UCI Track Cycling World Championships – Men's points race